Estelle M. H. Merrill (Hatch; pen name, Jean Kincaid; September 30, 1858 – July 29, 1908) was an American journalist and editor of the long nineteenth century. She lectured on various subjects, especially on educational and sociological questions, and was well-known as a leader and speaker in the club world. Merrill was a charter member of the New England Woman's Press Association.

Early life and education
Estelle Minerva Hatch was born at Jefferson, Maine, September 30, 1858. She was the daughter of Gilman E. and Celenda S. Hatch.

As a child, Merrill attended the public schools of her native town. At fourteen years of age, she entered Wheaton Seminary, Norton, Massachusetts, graduating in 1877.

Career
Upon her graduation, she returned to Jefferson to teach. At the end of two years' successful work in that place, she again came to Massachusetts, and taught school for three years in Hyde Park. She worked towards establishing in the public schools of Hyde Park an additional course, giving practical business training, opportunities for which previously could be obtained only at private schools.

A lover of nature from her girlhood, when she used to wander through the Maine woods, during her periods of teaching in the grammar and high school grades at Hyde Park, she was fitting herself at the Harvard Annex and with private teachers to take a professorship in botany, her favorite study. She also furnished at intervals articles for the Boston Transcript, written under the signature of "Jean Kincaid."

A break in health, the result of overwork, necessitated rest and change. During her long convalescence, she spent more time writing, her first regular work as a journalist being on the Boston Globe. From furnishing special articles, she progressed to a salaried position. Journalism became such a fascinating occupation that, though she was offered a lucrative professorship in botany in a Southern college, she chose to remain in the newspaper field. Merrill served as co-editor, with Dr. Mary Wood-Allen, of American Motherhood, a Boston magazine devoted to the interests of mothers and home-makers.

On October 1, 1887, she married Samuel Merrill, a native of Charlestown, New Hampshire, a member of the Suffolk County, Massachusetts bar, and of the editorial staff of the Boston Globe.

She was a pleasing and instructive lecturer on a variety of subjects, especially on educational and sociological questions. She was well-known as a leader and speaker in the club world. Merrill was the founder of the Cantabrigia Club, of which she became honorary vice-president; was one of the charter members of the New England Woman's Press Association and its first secretary; first president of the New England Wheaton Club,; president of the Wheaton Seminary Club; member of the Fathers' and Mothers' Club; vice-president of the Woman's Charity Club; and an officer in the Associated Charities of Cambridge, Massachusetts.

Estelle M. H. Merrill died on July 29, 1908, in Cambridge, Massachusetts.

Selected works
 Cambridge sketches by Cambridge authors, 1896

References

Attribution

Bibliography

External links
 

1858 births
1908 deaths
19th-century American newspaper editors
19th-century American women writers
19th-century pseudonymous writers
Pseudonymous women writers
People from Lincoln County, Maine
Journalists from Maine
Wheaton College (Massachusetts) alumni
American women non-fiction writers
Women newspaper editors